B with grave (majuscule: B̀, minuscule: b̀) is a letter of the Latin alphabet formed by addition of the grave accent over the letter B. It is used in Ntcham language spoken by Gurma people in Togo and Ghana.

Latin letters with diacritics